This page provides supplementary chemical data on pyridine.

Material Safety Data Sheet  

The handling of this chemical may incur notable safety precautions. It is highly recommend that you seek the Material Safety Datasheet (MSDS) for this chemical from a reliable source such as eChemPortal, and follow its directions. MSDS is available from Sigma - Aldrich.

Structure and properties

Thermodynamic properties

Vapor pressure of liquid

Table data obtained from CRC Handbook of Chemistry and Physics 44th ed.

Spectral data

References

 

Chemical data pages
Pyridines
Chemical data pages cleanup